Jethro is a male given name meaning "overflow". It is derived from the Hebrew word Yithrô.

People named Jethro 

 Kenneth C. "Jethro" Burns (1920–1989), mandolin player in satirical country music duo Homer and Jethro
 Jethro Franklin (born 1965), American football coach
 Jethro Pugh (born 1944), American football player
 Jethro Justinian Harris Teall (1849–1924), British geologist
 Jethro Tull (agriculturist) (1674–1741), British agricultural pioneer
 Jethro Sumner (1733–1785), officers in the American Continental Army
 Jetro Willems (born 1994), Dutch footballer
 Jethro (comedian) (1948–2021), British stand-up comedian, born Geoffrey Rowe

In sacred texts 
 Jethro (biblical figure), the father-in-law of Moses
 Yitro (parsha)
 Jethro in rabbinic literature
 Shuaib (Jethro in Islam)

Fictional characters
 Jethro, a character in OK K.O.! Let's Be Heroes
 Jethro, a character in the game GTA: San Andreas
 Jethro (Jerom in the original version), a character in the Belgian comic book series Spike and Suzy.
 Jethro Bodine, a character in the American sitcom The Beverly Hillbillies
 Albert Jethro 'A.J.' Chegwidden, a character in JAG
 Jethro Creighton, a character in the novel Across Five Aprils
 Jethro Cane, a character in the Doctor Who episode "Midnight"
 Leroy Jethro Gibbs, a character in NCIS
 Jethro Q. Walrustitty, a character in the Monty Python's Flying Circus sketch "Election Night Special"
 Jethro West, a character in Outrageous Fortune
 Jethro, a character in Micro Machines V3 and Micro Machines: The Animated Series
 Jethro "Jet" Bradley, a character in the video game Tron 2.0

See also
 Jethro Tull (band), a mainly 20th-century multiple gold-and-platinum record-releasing British rock group named after the agriculturalist

English masculine given names
Masculine given names
English given names